Emerald is a census-designated place in St. Croix County, Wisconsin, United States. As of the 2010 census, its population was 161.

History
A post office called Emerald was established in 1872, and remained in operation until it was discontinued in 1985. The community took its name from the Town of Emerald.

See also
 List of census-designated places in Wisconsin

References

External links

Census-designated places in St. Croix County, Wisconsin
Census-designated places in Wisconsin